Humberto Castellanos (born April 3, 1998) is a Mexican professional baseball pitcher in the Arizona Diamondbacks organization. He has previously played in MLB for the Houston Astros.

Career

Houston Astros
On July 2, 2015, Castellanos signed a minor league contract with Houston Astros. He made his professional debut in 2016 for the Dominican Summer League Astros. In 2017, he split the year between the rookie-level Gulf Coast Astros and Greenville Astros, and the Low-A Tri-City ValleyCats. In 14 games between the three affiliates, Castellanos posted a 6-1 record and 2.35 ERA with 40 strikeouts in 46.0 innings pitched.

Castellanos appeared in 23 games split between Tri-City and the Single-A Quad Cities River Bandits in 2018, working to a 3-2 record and 2.00 ERA with 50 strikeouts in 45.0 innings of work. In 2019, he split the season between Quad Cities, High-A Fayetteville Woodpeckers, and Triple-A Round Rock Express. Appearing in 34 contests for the three teams, Castellanos recorded a 4-2 record and 2.89 ERA with 83 strikeouts and 7 saves in 74.2 innings pitched. He was not immediately assigned to an affiliate to begin the 2020 season after the minor league season was cancelled because of the COVID-19 pandemic.

On August 2, 2020, Castellanos was selected to the 40-man roster and promoted to the major leagues for the first time. On August 4, he made his MLB debut against the Arizona Diamondbacks and pitched a scoreless ninth inning. He made 8 appearances for Houston in his rookie campaign, posting a 6.75 ERA with 12 strikeouts in 10.2 innings of work. On January 22, 2021, Castellanos was designated for assignment.

Arizona Diamondbacks
On January 29, 2021, Castellanos was claimed from the Astros by the Arizona Diamondbacks. He earned his first win and career hit in his second career start on August 18, 2021, against the Philadelphia Phillies. He made 14 appearances for Arizona in 2021, posting a 2–2 record and 4.93 ERA with 29 strikeouts in 45.2 innings of work.

In May 2022, Castellanos was placed on the injured list with a right elbow strain. On August 9, Castellanos underwent Tommy John surgery, ending his season. On the year, he had appeared in 11 games (9 of them starts), and recorded a 3–2 record and 5.68 ERA with 32 strikeouts in 44.1 innings pitched. On November 9, 2022, Castellanos was designated for assignment. He cleared waivers and was sent outright to the Triple-A Reno Aces on November 11.

International career
October 7, 2019, Castellanos was selected for Mexico national baseball team at the 2019 WBSC Premier12. He was sent outright on November 13, 2022.

References

External links

1998 births
Living people
Arizona Diamondbacks players
Baseball players from Jalisco
Charros de Jalisco players
Dominican Summer League Astros players
Mexican expatriate baseball players in the Dominican Republic
Fayetteville Woodpeckers players
Greeneville Astros players
Gulf Coast Astros players
Houston Astros players
Major League Baseball pitchers
Major League Baseball players from Mexico
Mexican expatriate baseball players in the United States
National baseball team players
People from Tepatitlán
Reno Aces players
Round Rock Express players
Quad Cities River Bandits players
Tri-City ValleyCats players
2019 WBSC Premier12 players